The Dayton Jets were an American minor professional ice hockey team in Dayton, Ohio.

History
The Jets played in the Continental Hockey League for the 1985–86 season and the All-American Hockey League for the 1986–87 season. The club merged with the Troy Sabres to form the Miami Valley Sabres after the 1987 season.

Season-by-season record

External links
 The Internet Hockey Database

Ice hockey teams in Dayton, Ohio
All-American Hockey League teams
Ice hockey clubs established in 1985
Ice hockey clubs disestablished in 1987
1985 establishments in Ohio
1987 disestablishments in Ohio